Lacey Alexander Collier (born June 23, 1935) is an American attorney and jurist, currently serving as a senior United States district judge of the United States District Court for the Northern District of Florida.

Early life and education

Collier was born in Demopolis, Alabama. He entered the United States Navy at age 20, serving from 1955 to 1975. He graduated with his Bachelor of Arts degree from the Naval Postgraduate School of the United States Naval Academy in 1970 and received a Master of Arts from the University of West Florida in 1972. After leaving the Navy, Collier received a Bachelor of Arts degree from the University of West Florida in 1975, and his Juris Doctor from the Florida State University College of Law in 1977.

Career 
After graduating from law school he served as an assistant state attorney for the First Judicial District from 1977 to 1984. He served as a circuit judge on the First Judicial District from 1984 to 1991.

Federal judicial service 

President George H. W. Bush nominated Collier to the United States District Court for the Northern District of Florida on July 24, 1991, to a new seat created by 104 Stat. 5089. Confirmed by the Senate on November 15, 1991, he received commission three days later. Collier assumed senior status on November 20, 2003.

References

Sources
 

1935 births
Living people
Florida State University College of Law alumni
Judges of the United States District Court for the Northern District of Florida
United States district court judges appointed by George H. W. Bush
20th-century American judges
People from Demopolis, Alabama
Naval Postgraduate School alumni
University of West Florida alumni
State attorneys
21st-century American judges